The Helochelydridae are an extinct family of stem-turtles known from fossils found in North America and Europe spanning the Early to Late Cretaceous.

Description 
The skull, shell and osteoderms of helochelydrids are covered in small, cylindrical protuberances, which are a distinctive characteristic of the group. They are thought to be terrestrial, based on the presence of limb osteoderms and bone histology. Their skull morphology is dissimilar to that of extant tortoises, suggesting an omnivorous habit similar to that of box turtles.

Taxonomy 
Helochelydridae includes all turtles that are more closely related to Helochelydra than Sichuanchelys, Meiolania, or extant turtles. Although referred to as Solemydidae in recent literature on extinct turtles, Helochelydridae has priority over Solemydidae. They are placed as part of the clade Perichelydia. Some recent studies have recovered them as paracryptodires, though other studies have found them to be more basal than paracryptodires.

Genera 
 Aragochersis Escucha Formation, Spain, Early Cretaceous (Albian)
 Helochelydra Wessex Formation, England, Early Cretaceous (Barremian)
“Helochelydra” anglica (Lydekker, 1889) Purbeck Group, United Kingdom, (Berriasian)
“Helochelydra” bakewelli Mantell, 1833 Tunbridge Wells Sandstone, England, (Valanginian)
 Helochelys Grünsandstein Formation, Germany, Late Cretaceous (Cenomanian), Cambridge Greensand, England, Albian-Cenomanian, France, Spain, Cenomanian
 Trachydermochelys phlyctaenus Seeley 1869 (revised Joyce, 2022), Cambridge Greensand, England, Albian-Cenomanian
 Naomichelys Cretaceous (Aptian-Campanian) North America
Plastremys Upper Greensand Formation, Cambridge Greensand, England, Albian-Cenomanian, Spain, Albian France, Cenomanian
 Solemys France, Spain, Late Cretaceous (Campanian-Maastrichtian)
 Trachyaspis turbulensis  Bergounioux 1957 Gargallo, Spain, Early Cretaceous (Aptian-Albian) (possibly synonymous with Plastremys rutteri)

Indeterminate remains most similar to “Helochelydra” anglica and “Helochelydra” bakewelli have been reported from the Berriasian aged Angeac-Charente bonebed of France.

References 

Testudinata
Prehistoric reptile families